Pierre de Soete (1886 – 16 August 1948) was a Belgian sculptor. His work was part of the sculpture event in the art competition at the 1928 Summer Olympics.

References

1886 births
1948 deaths
20th-century Belgian sculptors
Belgian sculptors
Olympic competitors in art competitions
People from Molenbeek-Saint-Jean